Vossius Gymnasium is a public gymnasium in Amsterdam, North Holland, Netherlands. It was established in 1926 and is named after Gerardus Vossius. In 2014, it was ranked best VWO school in Amsterdam and 4th in the country by RTL Nieuws. It is also consistently ranked among the best in the country in terms of final exam results.

History 
The gymnasium school type in the Netherlands originates from the “Latijnse school” (Latin school), a medieval school type for the upper class where Latin, an essential language for studying at university, was taught. The school originates from the in 1342 established “Hoofdschool”, which in the 16th century became the “Latijnse School”, which in turn became the “Amsterdam Stedelijk Gymnasium” in 1847. In the thirties of the 20th century, the Gymnasium school type became so popular that a second public gymnasium had to be founded in Amsterdam. Thus in 1926 the “Amsterdam Stedelijk Gymnasium” was split into the Barlaeus Gymnasium and the Vossius Gymnasium with the latter claiming the earlier dates of foundation.

Notable alumni 
 Arnon Grunberg, writer and journalist
 Gerard Reve, writer
 Rob du Bois, composer, pianist and jurist
 Rogier van Otterloo, composer and conductor
 Karel van het Reve, writer, translator and literary historian, teaching and writing on Russian literature
 Renate Rubinstein, writer, journalist and columnist
 Igor Sijsling, professional tennis player

Notable staff 
 Arnold Heertje, economist, professor, writer and columnist
 Jacques Presser, historian, writer and poet

References

External links 

 

Schools in Amsterdam
Gymnasiums in the Netherlands
Educational institutions established in 1926
1926 establishments in the Netherlands